Kajan may refer to:

Kajan, Gilan
Kajan, Isfahan
Kajan, Tehran